Kraussodontus is an extinct genus of gondolellid ozarkodinid conodonts of the Late Triassic (late Carnian) in the Pardonet Formation of Canada.

References

External links 

 

Ozarkodinida genera
Late Triassic fish
Triassic conodonts
Fossils of Canada